The 2009 PGA Championship was the 91st PGA Championship, held August 13–16 at Hazeltine National Golf Club in Chaska, Minnesota, a suburb southwest of Minneapolis.

Yang Yong-eun, more commonly referred to as "Y.E. Yang" in the U.S., won his first major title, three strokes ahead of runner-up Tiger Woods, a four-time champion. It marked the first time that Woods had failed to win a major he had led after 54 holes. Yang also became the first Asian-born player to win a men's major championship (although the third of Asian descent, after Vijay Singh and Woods).

It was the fourth major championship held at the course; it previously hosted the PGA Championship in 2002, won by Rich Beem, and two U.S. Opens (1970, 1991).

Course layout

Lengths of the course for previous majors:
 , par 72 - 2002 PGA Championship
 , par 72 - 1991 U.S. Open
 , par 72 - 1970 U.S. Open

Field

The following were the qualification criteria that were used to select the field. Each player is listed according to the first category by which he qualified, but other categories are shown in parentheses:

1. All former PGA Champions
Paul Azinger, Rich Beem, Mark Brooks, John Daly, Steve Elkington, Pádraig Harrington (4,6,8), Davis Love III (8,10), Shaun Micheel, Phil Mickelson (3,6,8,9,10), Vijay Singh (8,10), David Toms (6,8), Bob Tway, Tiger Woods (2,3,4,8,10)
(Eligible but not competing: Jack Burke Jr., Dow Finsterwald, Raymond Floyd, Doug Ford, Al Geiberger, Wayne Grady, David Graham, Hubert Green, Don January, John Mahaffey, Larry Nelson, Bobby Nichols, Jack Nicklaus, Gary Player, Nick Price, Jeff Sluman, Dave Stockton, Hal Sutton, Lee Trevino, Lanny Wadkins)

2. Last five U.S. Open Champions
Ángel Cabrera (3,8), Michael Campbell, Lucas Glover (8), Geoff Ogilvy (8,10)

3. Last five Masters Champions
Zach Johnson (8,10)
Trevor Immelman withdrew prior to the championship with a wrist injury.

4. Last five British Open Champions
Stewart Cink (8,9,10)

5. Current Senior PGA Champion
Michael Allen

6. 15 low scorers and ties in the 2008 PGA Championship
Stuart Appleby (8), Aaron Baddeley, Ben Curtis (8,9), Ken Duke, Steve Flesch, Alastair Forsyth, Sergio García (8), Graeme McDowell, Prayad Marksaeng, Andrés Romero, Justin Rose, Jeev Milkha Singh, Henrik Stenson (8,10), Camilo Villegas (8,10), Charlie Wi (8)
Paul Casey (8,10) withdrew prior to the championship due to a rib injury.

7. 20 low scorers in the 2009 PGA Professional National Championship
Sam Arnold, Ryan Benzel, Greg Bisconti, Keith Dicciani, Brian Gaffney, Bob Gaus, Scott Hebert, Todd Lancaster, Eric Lippert, Mitch Lowe, Mike Miles, Lee Rinker, Kevin Roman, Steve Schneiter, Mark Sheftic, Mike Small, Chris Starkjohann, Grant Sturgeon, Craig Thomas, Tim Weinhart

8. Top 70 leaders in official money standings from the 2008 WGC-Bridgestone Invitational and Legends Reno-Tahoe Open to the 2009 Buick Open
Robert Allenby, Stephen Ames, Woody Austin, Briny Baird, Cameron Beckman (10), Chad Campbell (9), K. J. Choi, Tim Clark, Ben Crane, Brian Davis, Luke Donald, Jason Dufner, Ernie Els, Jim Furyk (9), Brian Gay (10), Mathew Goggin, Retief Goosen (10), Paul Goydos, J. J. Henry, Charley Hoffman, Charles Howell III, Dustin Johnson (10), Jerry Kelly (10), Anthony Kim (9), Justin Leonard (9), Hunter Mahan (9), John Mallinger, Steve Marino, John Merrick, Kevin Na, Sean O'Hair (10), Jeff Overton, Pat Perez (10), Kenny Perry (9,10), Carl Pettersson (10), Ian Poulter, Brett Quigley, John Rollins (10), Rory Sabbatini (10), John Senden, Kevin Streelman, Steve Stricker (9,10), Kevin Sutherland, D. J. Trahan, Bo Van Pelt (10), Scott Verplank, Nick Watney (10), Bubba Watson, Mike Weir, Lee Westwood, Mark Wilson (10), Yang Yong-eun (10)

9. Members of the 2008 United States Ryder Cup team
J. B. Holmes, Boo Weekley

10. Winners of tournaments co-sponsored or approved by the PGA Tour since the 2008 PGA Championship
Michael Bradley, Nathan Green, Will MacKenzie, Ryan Palmer, Marc Turnesa

11. The PGA of America reserves the right to invite additional players not included in the categories listed above
Darren Clarke, Fred Couples, Nick Dougherty, Johan Edfors, Gonzalo Fernández-Castaño, Ross Fisher, Hiroyuki Fujita, Richard Green, Anders Hansen, Søren Hansen, Peter Hanson, Ryuji Imada, Ryo Ishikawa, Miguel Ángel Jiménez, Brendan Jones, Shingo Katayama, Martin Kaymer, Søren Kjeldsen, Tom Lehman, Thomas Levet, Rory McIlroy, Francesco Molinari, Colin Montgomerie, Louis Oosthuizen, Rod Pampling, Corey Pavin, Álvaro Quirós, Charl Schwartzel, Adam Scott, Michael Sim, David Smail, Brandt Snedeker, Richard Sterne, Thongchai Jaidee, Anthony Wall, Steve Webster, Oliver Wilson, Chris Wood
Robert Karlsson withdrew prior to the championship due to an eye injury.

12. Vacancies are filled by the first available player from the list of alternates (those below 70th place in official money standings)
 Scott McCarron (72) – took spot reserved for WGC-Bridgestone Invitational winner (Tiger Woods already eligible)
 Matt Kuchar (73) – took spot reserved for Legends Reno-Tahoe Open winner (John Rollins already eligible)
 Bob Estes (75) – replaced Trevor Immelman
 Michael Letzig (78) – withdrew from alternate list
 Tim Petrovic (79) – replaced Paul Casey

Nationalities in the field

Past champions in the field

Made the cut

Missed the cut

Round summaries

First round
Thursday, August 13, 2009

Tiger Woods had the outright lead after a 67 on the first round, which included 5 birdies and no bogeys. Defending champion Pádraig Harrington, who played in the same group as Woods, was in second place after a 68. David Toms, 2001 champion, also started well. He made many long birdie putts and par saves to shoot a 69, placing him in a group of six tied for third place that also included two-time champion Vijay Singh. World number two Phil Mickelson struggled slightly, shooting a 2-over par 74. John Daly, 1991 champion, withdrew after posting a 78,  citing a back injury.

Second round
Friday, August 14, 2009

Tiger Woods broke away from the pack with a run of three straight birdies on the back nine, finishing the round with a four-shot lead. It is his largest margin after two rounds at a major since the 2005 British Open at St Andrews, when he led by five. Conditions on the second day were tough, with strong winds playing with putts and uneven greens. Vijay Singh, Lucas Glover and Brendan Jones, who moved up the leaderboard into second place, all played in the morning. The other two in the group tied for second place, Pádraig Harrington and Ross Fisher, had to cope with the fierce afternoon winds.

Third round
Saturday, August 15, 2009

Tiger Woods played a safe round, avoiding throwing away shots. His lead was halved to two shots over Pádraig Harrington and 2009 Honda Classic winner Yang Yong-eun. Henrik Stenson, winner of that year's Players Championship, scored a round of 68 and was tied for fourth place along with U.S. Open champion Lucas Glover. Ernie Els was as close as one shot from the lead but finished with three straight bogeys.

Final round 
Sunday, August 16, 2009

Struggling with his putting all day, Tiger Woods was in jeopardy of losing a major for the first time when leading after 54 holes.  The only player who was able to take advantage of this was Woods' playing partner, Yang Yong-eun. Defending champion Pádraig Harrington was in contention early, but made a quintuple-bogey 8 on the par-3 8th, causing him to fall from tied for 2nd to tied for 10th. Lucas Glover also reached contention, but faded with 4 bogeys in a span of 7 holes.  Tied on the short par-4 14th, Yang chipped in for eagle from just off the green.  The eagle gave Yang the lead which he did not relinquish.  Yang sealed the victory by drawing a  approach around a tree to within ten feet (3 m) on the final hole, setting up a birdie against Woods' closing bogey and a winning margin of three strokes.

Source:
Complete leaderboard

Scorecard
Final round

Cumulative tournament scores, relative to par

Source:

References

External links
2009 Official site
Coverage on European Tour's official site
Hazeltine National Golf Club

PGA Championship
Golf in Minnesota
Sports in Minneapolis–Saint Paul
PGA Championship
PGA Championship
PGA Championship